Dream Boy is a 2008 gay-themed Southern Gothic drama film written and directed by James Bolton and based on Jim Grimsley's 1995 novel of the same name about two gay teenagers who fall in love in the rural South during the late 1970s. It stars Stephan Bender and Max Roeg.

Plot

Fifteen-year-old Nathan Davies (Stephan Bender) moves to St. Francisville, Louisiana, a small Southern town with his parents (Thomas Jay Ryan and Diana Scarwid) and starts to befriend the older boy next door, Roy (Maximillian Roeg), fellow high school student and bus driver, who is in a relationship with Evelyn (Rooney Mara). Nathan and Roy start to develop their relationship by helping each other with school work at Nathan's house. While Roy is teaching Nathan how to solve an algebra problem, Nathan touches his hand. Roy pulls away at first, but then takes hold of Nathan's hand.

After they finish their work, the boys go for a walk in the woods, finding an old cemetery, where they stop and start kissing. They undress down to everything but socks and underwear, and lie in an embrace together. The relationship between Nathan and his father is revealed to be a little strange and full of tension. One morning Roy pulls the bus into a part in the woods and they kiss and Nathan touches Roy. Roy asks if Nathan has ever done this with anyone before, and he promises he never has. Roy takes Nathan swimming with Burke and Randy, but Nathan admits he can't swim. While watching Roy, Burke threatens to throw him in the water, but Roy stops him. While Roy is driving them home, he pulls onto the side of the road and they start kissing. When Nathan starts to have sex with Roy, Roy angrily stops him, asking "who taught [him] to screw like that". Nathan swears "no one".

When Nathan gets home that night, his father wants to know if he had a good time. Nathan is on the brink of tears as he answers his father. He ties a string up to his dresser drawer and bedpost, tucks his pillows under his sheets, and moves to the floor to sleep. In the night he hears a thud and runs from his room, because it's his father sneaking in. It is later revealed that his father had touched him in the past inappropriately. Nathan sleeps outside and comes home only for meals, but returns to his tree outside after eating.

Roy finds him and offers him a place to sleep in his family's barn. The next morning, Nathan goes home for breakfast and his father catches him, yelling at him to not run from him, but Nathan's mother interrupts and he runs to the school bus. Later, Roy tells Nathan they're going camping with Burke and Randy that weekend. That night, Roy tells ghost stories around the campfire, and in their tent, Nathan gives Roy a blowjob, and Roy asks him if he minds when Roy doesn't do those things back to him, and Nathan says he doesn't mind. Hiking through the woods, the boys find an old plantation house. They go inside to investigate, and Nathan hears a voice call his name, resembling his father's. They then find cloth with what looks like to be blood on it, and they smell sulfur (which Nathan says is the smell of the Devil), and the boys see a shadow move up the stairs.

Burke takes the flashlight from Roy and goes to investigate with Randy. Roy and Nathan go into a bedroom and talk, and Nathan says he feels as if he'll never leave that house. He hears the voice again and Roy goes to see if the guys are back. Nathan sees his father and closes his eyes tight, when Roy enters the room again. He tells Nathan not to look at whatever he's seeing anymore and kisses him. Roy gets down on his knees and proceeds to fellate Nathan, when Burke and Randy find them. Roy storms out of the room, and Nathan hears the voice again, and is suddenly knocked unconscious. A shadow of a person carries him up the stairs.

In the attic, Burke rapes Nathan, and realizing what he's done, disgusted with himself, he breaks an arm off a rocking chair and knocks Nathan over the head with it. Blood starts pooling on the floor beneath Nathan's head, and Burke leaves him in the attic. When Roy and Randy find Nathan early the next morning, he appears to be dead. Roy tells Randy to go on and find Burke, whom he says he doesn't believe at this point about what happened. Roy cries once Randy leaves, then Roy leaves too. The police arrive, bringing Nathan's father who tearfully covers Nathan's face with a blanket.

Nathan awakens as if he's resurrected from the dead, gets up and leaves the plantation house. He wanders for a long time still dazed from the blow to his head. Finally he sees Roy coming out of Sunday evening church, but Roy is with his family, so Nathan wanders around some more waiting for Roy to get home. Nathan's mother leaves his father, and Nathan, his head now clear, finds Roy crying in the barn where Nathan slept while hiding from his father. As Roy looks up, he sees Nathan and hugs him.

At the end of the story, Roy is driving the bus and looks in the mirror to an empty seat, but when he looks a second time, Nathan is there smiling at him.

Differences from novel 
The movie departs from the novel and leaves the impression that Nathan is truly dead, and that the previous scenes were a wishful dream sequence of one of the two boy lovers, presumably Roy. In the book this scene does not take place. The book has the boys meeting in the yard of Roy's church, running together into the woods to talk things over, and deciding to run away together since Roy has been seen kissing Nathan by both Burke and Randy, and both boys will surely be outed to their families and the whole community. The book ends with: "They hear the voices of people searching for them in the woods. They stand and go. They never look back."

Cast
 Stephan Bender as Nathan Davies
 Maximillian Roeg as Roy
 Randy Wayne as Burke, one of Roy's best friends
 Owen Beckman as Randy, one of Roy's best friends
 Thomas Jay Ryan as Harland Davies, Nathan's abusive father
 Diana Scarwid as Vivian Davies, Nathan's mother
 Rooney Mara as Evelyn, Roy's girlfriend
 Rickie Lee Jones as Roy's mother

Release
Dream Boy first screened at the Berlin International Film Festival in Germany on February 12, 2008. Its first American screening was on October 24, 2008 at the Chicago International Film Festival. The film was released on DVD in North America on August 24, 2010.

References

External links
 
 
 
 

2008 LGBT-related films
2008 romantic drama films
2008 films
American coming-of-age films
American LGBT-related films
American romantic drama films
American romantic fantasy films
American teen drama films
Films based on American novels
Films set in the 1970s
Films set in the United States
Incest in film
American independent films
LGBT-related coming-of-age films
LGBT-related romantic drama films
Gay-related films
2000s English-language films
2000s American films